Fatimah Linda Collier Jackson is an American biologist and anthropologist. She is a Professor of Biology at Howard University and Director of its Cobb Research Laboratory.

Early life, family and education

Jackson was raised in Denver, Colorado. Her mother was raised in Cambridge, Massachusetts. Fatimah's father was a mechanic who died when she was six years old. One of her great-grandmothers was descended from Choctaw people and was an herbalist. She attended elementary school, junior high school, and high school which were predominantly African-American.

After high school, she attended the University of Colorado. She transferred to Cornell University, however, where she earned her B.A. (cum laude and with distinction in all subjects), M.A., and Ph.D. from Cornell University. She trained in human biology. Both she and her husband, Robert Jackson, spent years performing research in Africa.

Career 
In 1981 she became Assistant Professor at University of California, Berkeley in its Department of Anthropology before moving to the University of Florida in 1986 as Associate Professor. She became professor emerita of applied biological anthropology at the University of Maryland after teaching there for 20 years (1990–2011), which was recognised by a Distinguished Scholar Teacher Award in 1995. In 2009 Jackson held a professorship and director role in biological anthropology at the University of North Carolina at Chapel Hill (UNC). She became a professor of biology and director of the W. Montague Cobb Research Laboratory at Howard University in 2013. Jackson served as director of UNC's Institute of African American Research from 2009 to 2011. She serves now as the director/curator of the W. Montague Cobb Research Lab. Her research on peoples of recent African-descent also led to appearances on the PBS programs African American Lives and Nova and the BBC's Motherland..

Research 
Jackson specializes in the study of human-plant coevolution and anthropological genetics, especially African human genetics and population biological substructures in peoples of African descent. For example, genetic changes in human evolution due to cultural migrations. Another example is the influence of phytochemicals on human metabolic effects. She has also conducted work in gene-environment interactions in chronic disease.

At the Cobb Research Lab, Jackson conducts studies on African-American biological history with access to the largest collection of African-American skeletal and dental remains in the world.

Jackson has published in many scientific and scholastic journals, including Human Biology, Biochemical Medicine and Metabolic Biology, American Journal of Human Biology, and Journal of the National Medical Association. In 2008, Jackson published a paper using the method of ethnogenetic layering (EL) for analysis of health disparities across microethnic groups (MEG). The current use of racial models for analysis of variation in disease may fail to capture medically relevant information. EL relies on computational approaches by using GIS-facilitated maps to produce geographical regional profiles which are used to better understand disease risk. Some incorporated information includes, local historical demography, genetic diversity, cultural patterns, and specific chronic disease risks (such dietary and toxicological exposures).

Honors and awards
She won the Nick Norgan Award in 2009 for the Best Article Published in Annals of Human Biology. She was awarded the Ernest E. Just Prize in Medical and Public Health Research by Avery Research Institute of College of Charleston and Medical University of South Carolina in 2012 as its first recipient.

In 2017, she received the STEM Woman Researcher of the Year from Howard University. That same year, she received the Outstanding Service Award from the Department of Biology at Howard University.

In 2020, Jackson was awarded the Charles R. Darwin Lifetime Achievement Award from the American Association of Physical Anthropologists. She is the first African-American woman to receive this award.

She has also been a Fulbright Senior Fellow.

Personal life
Jackson is an observant Muslim; she converted when she was in graduate school at Cornell University.

At age 19, she married Robert Jackson, now a professor of nutrition. They met after Fatimah transferred colleges to Cornell University. They have six children.

References

External links

Cornell University alumni
Howard University faculty
University of Maryland, College Park faculty
University of California, Berkeley people
University of Florida people
University of North Carolina at Chapel Hill people
American anthropologists
American women anthropologists
Year of birth missing (living people)
Living people
African-American scientists
American women scientists
American women academics
21st-century African-American people
21st-century African-American women